The Public Prosecutor's Office of Costa Rica is the authority responsible for the legal prosecution of criminal acts within the state's legal system. It organises the investigation and prosecution of crimes affecting broader society. In investigating crimes, it works jointly with the Judicial Investigation Department.

In some cases, a representative of the Public Prosecutor's Office may have the authority to request that the criminal prosecution be limited to certain offences or persons who participated in the act. It may also request that the case be totally or partially dismissed. The office may also intervene in criminal enforcement proceedings, in the civil defence of the victim when appropriate, and assume the other functions assigned to it by law.

History
Law No. 5377, passed on 19 October 1973, created the current criminal code of Costa Rica. Article 39 of the law called for the establishment of the Public Prosecutor's Office by transferring the prosecutional powers of the Attorney General's Office to the Judiciary. Because the Public Prosecutor's Office of Costa Rica was created by a legislative act, it is therefore not a part of the constitutional organisation of the government. The body that exists today as an auxiliary institution of the current justice department began operation on 1 June 1975.

The current prosecutor general leading the Public Prosecutor's Office is Emilia Navas Aparicio. Her predecessor, Jorge Chavarría Guzmán, held the position from 2010 until 2017 when he was forced to resign due to allegations that he concealed evidence in relation to "el Cementazo", a political scandal.

List of prosecutor generals 

 José Chaverri Rodríguez, 1975–1976
 Jorge Rojas Espinoza, 1977–1982
 Fernando Cruz Castro, 1984–1986
 Eduardo Araya Vega, 1986–1989
 José María Tijerino Pacheco, 1990–1995
 Carlos Arias Nuñez, 1996–2003
 Francisco Dall'anese Ruiz, 2003–2010
 Jorge Chavarría Guzmán, 2010–2017
 Emilia Navas Aparicio, 2017–2021

Organizational structure
The Public Ministry is made up of different departments and prosecutors' offices, including:

 Prosecutor General's Office
 Deputy Prosecutor General's Office
 Fiscal Council
 Technical Advisory and International Relations Office
 Fiscal Investigation Department
 Training and Monitoring Department
 Administrative Department
 Property Crime Department
 Drug Trafficking and Juvenile Delinquency Department
 Associate Department of Economic Crimes, Corruption, and Taxes
 Penal Enforcement
 Scam Department
 Vehicle Theft Department
 Department of Domestic Violence and Sex Crimes
 Associate Environmental Department 
 Office of Civil Defense of the Victim
 Office of Information and Guidance for the Victim

Office of Civil Defense of the Victim 
The Office of Civil Defense of the Victim was established on 1 January 1998, as part of a legislative change to the criminal code. The office provides the victims of a crime with a legal representative to help them obtain compensation for the damages they have suffered. Any member of the public may have a lawyer assigned to them, free of charge, who takes the necessary steps to ensure that the accused or responsible party pays for the damages caused. If the office verifies that the victim did have sufficient resources to hire a private legal representative to handle the case, it will make the necessary arrangements for the victim to pay for the professional services rendered.

See also 
 Supreme Court of Costa Rica
 Judicial Investigation Department

References

External links
 Official Site

Institutions of Costa Rica
Law of Costa Rica
Organizations established in 1975